The Grigorovich MR-5 was a long-range reconnaissance flying boat designed by the Grigorovich Design Bureau for the Soviet Navy in the late 1920s.

Design
The MR-5 was similar to the MR-2 in layout, armament, and payload, but had a more powerful BMV VI engine and an all-metal hull. Flight tests were conducted in Taganrog beginning in July 1929, and although the aircraft behaved well in the air, takeoff was sluggish.

Specifications

References

Sources

Biplanes
Flying boats
1920s Soviet and Russian military reconnaissance aircraft
MR-5
Aircraft first flown in 1929